Alessandro Mapelli-Mozzi (born 7 May 1951) is a British-Italian alpine skier. He competed in three events at the 1972 Winter Olympics. He holds both British and Italian citizenship. He is the father-in-law of Princess Beatrice. In 2012, he  was reported as residing in La Garde-Freinet, France. He is a member of an Italian noble family, whose family seat is the Villa Mapelli Mozzi. As Italian nobility has been abolished, his title of count is not officially recognised in either Italy or the UK; he uses the title  "as a courtesy".

Early life  and career 
Mapelli-Mozzi was a boarder at Downside School, Somerset, England, from May 1965 to July 1969.
 
He has  worked internationally as  an art  dealer and curator.

Personal life
He married Nicola Burrows from Oxfordshire on 8 March 1978. They have two children: Natalia Alice (born 1981) and Edoardo Alessandro (born 1983), husband of Princess Beatrice.

References

External links
 

1951 births
Living people
British male alpine skiers
Counts of Italy
Olympic alpine skiers of Great Britain
Alpine skiers at the 1972 Winter Olympics
Place of birth missing (living people)
People educated at Downside School
Alex Mapelli-Mozzi
English people of Italian descent
People from Ponte San Pietro
Sportspeople from the Province of Bergamo